Dymitr is a given name. Notable people with the name include:

Dymitr of Goraj (1340–1400), a Grand Crown Marshal from 1390 and Court Treasurer in the years 1364–1370 and 1377–1391
Michał Dymitr Krajewski (1746–1817), Polish writer and educational activist of the times of the Enlightenment in Poland
Dymitr of Sienno, 15th century Polish nobleman of the Debno Coat of Arms
Jan Dymitr Solikowski (1539–1603), Polish writer, diplomat, Archbishop of Lwów
Dymitr Jerzy Wiśniowiecki (1631–1682), Polish magnate and szlachcic

See also

 Dmytro
 Dmitry